Darren Evans (born November 9, 1988) is a former American football running back. He was signed by the Indianapolis Colts as an undrafted free agent in 2011. He played college football at Virginia Tech.

Early years
Evans attended Warren Central High School in Indianapolis, Indiana. As a sophomore, he had 309 attempts for 2,248 yards and 27 touchdowns. As a senior, he was awarded Indiana's Mr. Football Award in 2006 (an honor given to the top high school football player in the state of Indiana) with 288 attempts 2731 yards and 61 touchdowns.

College career

2008 season
On November 6, 2008, Evans broke Mike Imoh's school single-game rushing record, rushing for 253 yards against Maryland. Evans is also the only player in school history to rush for a touchdown during each of his first six games.

Evans was named most valuable player in the 2009 Orange Bowl after gaining 153 yards on 28 carries, and scoring a game-clinching touchdown.

In 2009 summer practice, Evans tore the anterior cruciate ligament in his left knee, which forced him to miss the 2009 season.

College statistics

Professional career

Indianapolis Colts
Evans was signed by the Indianapolis Colts as an undrafted free agent following the 2011 NFL Draft on July 26, 2011. Evans was released on September 20 but added to the practice squad on the 22nd. Evans was re-signed to the active roster on October 15, 2011. He was released by Indianapolis on August 31, 2012.

Tennessee Titans
Evans was signed to the Tennessee Titans practice squad September 3, 2012. He was released on April 19, 2013.

References

External links
Virginia Tech Hokies bio
Interview with Evans and his coach

1988 births
Living people
American football running backs
Virginia Tech Hokies football players
Players of American football from Indianapolis
Indianapolis Colts players
Tennessee Titans players